Armorial of Little Russia is an armorial of noble Ukrainian (Little Russian) families from the Russian Empire. It was published in 1914, in Saint Petersburg, by the nobility of Chernigov Governorate. The Armorial was edited by Russian historian Vladislav Lukomski and Ukrainian historian Vadym Modzalevski, and illustrated by Ukrainian artist Heorhiy Narbut. It contains images and description of 700 coats of arms of Ukrainian, predominantly Cossack, families.

Gallery

Sources
В. К. Лукомскїй, В. Л. Модзалевскїй. Малороссїйский гербовnикъ. — Санкт-Петербургъ: типография С.Н. Тройницкого "Сириус", изданїε Черниговскаго дворѧнства, 1914.

External links

 Armorial of Little Russia (Малороссийский гербовник (1914)). geraldika.ru.

Rolls of arms
Russian Empire
Zaporozhian Host
1914 non-fiction books
Books about Ukraine
Cossack culture